Lauren Wilkinson may refer to:

Lauren Wilkinson (rower) (born 1989), Canadian rower
Lauren Wilkinson (ice hockey) (born 1989), British ice hockey player
Lauren Wilkinson (writer), American fiction writer